The Colorado Territory was formally created in 1861 shortly before the bombardment of Fort Sumter sparked the American Civil War. Although sentiments were somewhat divided in the early days of the war, Colorado was only marginally a pro-Union territory (four statehood attempts were thwarted, largely by Confederate sympathizers in July 1862, February 1863, February 1864, and January 1866). Colorado was strategically important to both the Union and Confederacy because of the gold and silver mines there as both sides wanted to use the mineral wealth to help finance the war. The New Mexico Campaign (February to April 1862) was a military operation conducted by Confederate Brigadier General Henry Sibley to gain control of the Southwest, including the gold fields of Colorado, the mineral-rich territory of Nevada and the ports of California. The campaign was intended as a prelude to an invasion of the Colorado Territory and an attempt to cut the supply lines between California and the rest of the Union. However, the Confederates were defeated at the Battle of Glorieta Pass in New Mexico and were forced to retreat back to Texas, effectively ending the New Mexico Campaign.

Confederate sympathizers
During the late 1850's, many Southerners migrated to the Colorado Territory in search of new opportunities, including working in the newly discovered gold fields. When the War broke out, many returned to the South to defend their homes. However, some remained and formed militia groups in Fairplay, Leadville, Denver and Mace's Hole (present day Beulah). These Confederate Partisan Ranger units operated in the Colorado Territory from 1861 to 1865, raiding supply wagon trains, disrupting communications lines, recruiting volunteers, and skirmishing with Union troops. There were also pockets of strong support for the Confederacy in the mining areas and in the Arkansas River Valley, from Cañon City eastward to Lamar, and Cañon City southward to Trinidad.

The first actual demonstration of opposition to the Union occurred in Denver on April 24, 1861 just a few days after the bombardment of Fort Sumter. Denver awakened to find the "Stars and Bars" had been raised over the Wallingford & Murphy store on Larimer Street. A turbulent pro-Union crowd soon gathered in front of the store, and demanded that the flag be taken down. The Southern adherents were equally determined that the flag should stay. A young man in the crowd, Samuel M. Logan, later a Captain in the First Colorado Volunteers, climbed to the roof of the store to remove the flag. There are conflicting reports as to what happened next; some say a compromise was reached and the flag was permitted to remain for one day, while others state the flag was removed.

In 1861, when Confederate General Sibley organized his army to invade New Mexico, he commissioned Captain George Madison to go into Colorado with a twofold mission: disrupt federal mail and communication lines, and to help organize Confederate recruitment there. At this time, Confederate recruits in Colorado were first sent to a camp in the Pikes Peak area, and then sent to the main Confederate encampment at Mace's Hole. In early 1862, Captain Madison and his men captured mail en route to Ft. Garland. Madison was also actively planning a raid on Ft. Garland. Federal soldiers learned of the encampment at Mace's Hole and broke up the regiment while many of the Confederates were away. The Federals captured forty-four Confederates and took them to Denver.

The "Reynolds Gang", a group of Southern sympathizers, operated in South Park in 1864.  Their objective was to rob the gold mines in the area to help finance the Confederate government. However, their goal was never accomplished and the members were eventually captured. While the captured Southern sympathizers were being taken to Fort Lyon, the first stop on their way to Denver for a military trial, they attempted their escape. A gunfight ensued and three of the prisoners were killed. However, two managed to steal horses in the confusion and escaped to the New Mexico Territory.

Other Colorado Confederate ties
Colorado was the only non-Southern state to have two ex-Confederate Soldiers elected as state governors:

 James B. Grant (Private, Company B, 20th Alabama Light Artillery Battalion, Confederate States of America) served as the 3rd Governor of Colorado from 1883 to 1885.
 Charles S. Thomas (Private, Georgia State Militia, Confederate States of America) served as the 11th Governor of Colorado from 1899 to 1901 and as a U.S. Senator from 1913 to 1921.
 Margaret Howell Davis Hayes, Confederate States of America President Jefferson Davis' daughter, and her husband, Joel Addison Hayes moved to Colorado Springs in 1885.  As her husband rose in city banking circles, Margaret became involved with charitable causes and was a leading member of local society. After her death in 1909, Addison and the children took her ashes to Richmond to be interred with the Davis family at Hollywood Cemetery.

Colorado is also the only non-Southern State to host a national convention of surviving Confederate Veterans. The national organization of the United Confederate Veterans (active from 1890 to 1951) held their 49th Reunion in Trinidad, Colorado from August 22–25, 1939.

Union regiments
When President Abraham Lincoln called for volunteer soldiers to supplement the Regular Army, Colorado residents responded, with nearly 4,000 men eventually enlisting in the volunteer Union forces authorized by the United States War Department. Hundreds more served in militia companies, authorized by the territorial governor, most of which were formed to fight Indians rather than Confederates. Three regiments of infantry were organized, which were reorganized as two regiments of cavalry, while a third regiment of cavalry was raised in 1864. Other residents enlisted in New Mexico units.

The territory's first governor, William Gilpin, organized the 1st Colorado Infantry in August 1861. Nicknamed "Gilpin's Pet Lambs" because of the governor's involvement in their organization, the regiment and its first commander, John P. Slough, marched to northern New Mexico Territory in February–March 1862. There they fought in the battles of Apache Canyon, Glorieta Pass and Peralta. Slough resigned in April 1862 and was replaced by Major John M. Chivington.

A second regiment, the 2nd Colorado Infantry, was organized in February 1862, with four existing companies of independent militia joining the volunteer service and forming the nucleus of the new regiment, which primarily fought Indians during its existence, although battalions from the regiment fought at the Battle of Honey Springs in present-day Oklahoma. Much of the regiment was later consolidated with the 3rd Colorado Infantry Regiment and reformed into the 2nd Colorado Cavalry. (The 1st Colorado Cavalry had been organized in November 1862.) In January 1864, the 2nd Colorado Cavalry was ordered to the Missouri border counties  to relieve Kansas troops defending against Confederate Partisan Units. Beginning in late April 1864, the regiment fought several skirmishes with Confederate Partisans throughout the summer months, as well as a raid on regular Confederate cavalry at the Battle of Camden Point, while John Evans, the new governor of Colorado Territory, pleaded for their return to Colorado. Just as the 2nd Colorado prepared to return for Indian-fighting duty in Colorado, Confederate General Sterling Price began his campaign to secure Missouri for the Confederacy. The 2nd Colorado was attached to the Union force raised to repel General Price's Missouri State Guards, and took part in the battles of the Little Blue River, Westport, Marais des Cygnes, and Mine Creek in October 1864. When Price withdrew, the 2nd Colorado was part of the pursuit, meeting him for the last time near Fayetteville, Arkansas, in November 1864.

The 3rd Colorado Cavalry Regiment, a hundred days regiment raised in August 1864, was involved in a series of bloody attacks on local Indians, including the notorious Sand Creek Massacre against a village of peaceful Cheyennes. The commander of the regiment, Colonel John Chivington, was accused of perpetrating a massacre but many in the territory, including the territorial legislature, came to his defense and consequently Chivington was never court–martialed.

Notes

References
 History of Colorado. Wilbur Fisk Stone, Editor, Volume I, Chicago, S. J. Clarke Publishing Company, 1918.
 Colton, Ray C. The Civil War in the Western Territories: Arizona, Colorado, New Mexico, and Utah. University of Oklahoma Press, 1959.
 Josephy Jr., Alvin M. The Civil War in the American West. Alfred A. Knope, 1991. .
 Smith, Duane A. The Birth of Colorado: A Civil War Perspective. University of Oklahoma Press, 1989. .
 Walker, Johnny. South Park, Colorado Gold Prospecting & The Reynolds Gang. Colorado Adventure Guide, Heritage and History.

Further reading
 Adams, Blanche V., "The Second Colorado Cavalry in the Civil War," Colorado Magazine, VII, 3, May 1931.
 Carey, Raymond G., "Colonel Chivington, Brigadier General Connor, and Sand Creek," Denver Posse of the Westerners 1960 Brand Book. Boulder: The Johnson Publishing Company, 1961; "The Bloodless Third' Regiment, Colorado Volunteer Cavalry," Colorado Magazine, Vol. 38 No. 4, October 1961.
 Colton, Ray C., The Civil War in the Western Territories. Norman: The University of Oklahoma Press, 1959.
 Hollister, Ovando J., History of the First Regiment of Colorado Volunteers, Denver: Thomas Gibson & Co., 1863. Reprint: Colorado Volunteers in New Mexico, 1862. Chicago: R. R. Donnelley & Sons Co., The Lakeside Press, 1962.
 Nankivell, Major John H., History of the Military Organizations of the State of Colorado. Denver: The W.H. Kistler Stationery Co., 1935.
 Smith, Duane A., The Birth of Colorado: A Civil War Perspective. Norman: University of Oklahoma Press, 1989.
 U. S. War Department. The War of the Rebellion. A Compilation of the Official Records of the Union and Confederate Armies. Four series, 128 vols. Washington: Government Printing Office, 1880–1901.
 Whitford, William C., Colorado Volunteers in the Civil War. Denver: Colorado State Historical Society, 1909; Golden, Colorado: Pruett Press, 1963. Colorado in the New Mexico Campaign, 1906
 Williams, Mrs. Ellen. Three Years and a Half in the Army; or, History of the Second Colorados. New York: Fowler & Wells Company, 1885.

External links
 National Park Service map of Civil War sites in Colorado
 Colorado state website for the Civil War
 Colorado Division, Sons of Confederate Veterans
 Dan Ellis Connor, Colorado Confederate
 Account of Reynolds' gang and stage robberies in South Park
 Reenacting group of Company A, 2nd Colorado Infantry

 
American Civil War
American Civil War
American Civil War by state